Vrelo may refer to:

Places

Bosnia and Herzegovina
Vrelo (Cazin)

Kosovo
Vrelo (Istok)

Serbia
Vrelo (Aleksinac)
Vrelo (Babušnica)
Vrelo (Kuršumlija)
Vrelo (Niš)
Vrelo (Ub)

Other
 Vrelo (river)